Sobhan Rouhi (born 13 December 1947) is a retired Iranian light-flyweight freestyle wrestler. He won a silver medal at the 1974 Asian Games and competed in the 1976 Summer Olympics. After retiring from competitions Rouhi worked as a wrestling coach.

References

1947 births
Living people
Olympic wrestlers of Iran
Wrestlers at the 1976 Summer Olympics
Iranian male sport wrestlers
Asian Games silver medalists for Iran
Asian Games medalists in wrestling
Wrestlers at the 1974 Asian Games
Medalists at the 1974 Asian Games
People from Qaem Shahr
Asian Wrestling Championships medalists
People from Juybar
Sportspeople from Mazandaran province
20th-century Iranian people
21st-century Iranian people